Town Creek may refer to the following places in the United States:

Communities
 Town Creek, Alabama, a town in Lawrence County
 Town Creek, Dallas, Texas, a neighborhood in the Lake Highlands area
 Town Creek, Maryland, an unincorporated community in Allegany County

Waterways
 Town Creek (Mississippi), a tributary stream of the Tombigbee River
 Town Creek (Chestatee River tributary), a tributary of Tesnatee Creek in Georgia
 Town Creek (Talking Rock Creek tributary), a stream in Georgia
 Town Creek (Withlacoochee River tributary), a stream in Georgia
 Town Creek (Patuxent River), a tributary of the Patuxent River in Saint Mary's County, Maryland
 Town Creek (Potomac River), a tributary of the Potomac River in Maryland and Pennsylvania
 Town Creek (Tred Avon River), a tributary of the Tred Avon River, Talbot County, Maryland

Other
 Town Creek Indian Mound, a National Historic Landmark in North Carolina

See also
 Blood Creek, a 2009 Joel Schumacher horror film also known as Town Creek